Nikolay Petrovich Osipov (1751 in Saint Petersburg –  in Saint Petersburg, Russian Empire) was a Russian writer, poet and translator. He is best known for his mock-heroic 1791 poem  (parts 5 and 6 were completed after his death by Aleksandr Kotelnitsky).

Osipov's  Eneida is a parody of Virgil's Aeneid, where the Trojan heroes talk like 18th-century Russians.

Osipov's Eneida (1791) and Kotliarevsky's Eneida (1798) 

Osipov's Eneida was a model for Ivan Kotliarevsky’s seminal 1798 Ukrainian-language version, although the latter used a different setting and adopted a new verse form.

References

18th-century writers from the Russian Empire
18th-century male writers
1751 births
1799 deaths